The compact disc (CD) is a digital optical disc data storage format that was co-developed by Philips and Sony to store and play digital audio recordings. In August 1982, the first compact disc was manufactured. It was then released in October 1982 in Japan and branded as Digital Audio Compact Disc.

The format was later adapted (as CD-ROM) for general-purpose data storage. Several other formats were further derived, including write-once audio and data storage (CD-R), rewritable media (CD-RW), Video CD (VCD), Super Video CD (SVCD), Photo CD, Picture CD, Compact Disc-Interactive (CD-i) and Enhanced Music CD.

Capacity is routinely extended to 80 minutes and 700 MiB by arranging data more closely on the same-sized disc.

At the time of the technology's introduction in 1982, a CD could store much more data than a personal computer hard disk drive, which would typically hold 10 MiB. By 2010, hard drives commonly offered as much storage space as a thousand CDs, while their prices had plummeted to commodity levels. In 2004, worldwide sales of audio CDs, CD-ROMs, and CD-Rs reached about 30 billion discs. By 2007, 200 billion CDs had been sold worldwide.

Physical details 

From the center outward, components are: the center spindle hole (15 mm), the first-transition area (clamping ring), the clamping area (stacking ring), the second-transition area (mirror band), the program (data) area, and the rim. The inner program area occupies a radius from 25 to 58 mm.

A thin layer of aluminum or, more rarely, gold is applied to the surface, making it reflective. The metal is protected by a film of lacquer normally spin coated directly on the reflective layer. The label is printed on the lacquer layer, usually by screen printing or offset printing.

CD data is represented as tiny indentations known as pits, encoded in a spiral track moulded into the top of the polycarbonate layer. The areas between pits are known as lands. Each pit is approximately 100 nm deep by 500 nm wide, and varies from 850 nm to 3.5 µm in length. The distance between the tracks (the pitch) is 1.6 µm.

When playing an audio CD, a motor within the CD player spins the disc to a scanning velocity of 1.2–1.4 m/s (constant linear velocity, CLV)—equivalent to approximately 500 RPM at the inside of the disc, and approximately 200 RPM at the outside edge. The track on the CD begins at the inside and spirals outward so a disc played from beginning to end slows its rotation rate during playback.

The program area is 86.05 cm2 and the length of the recordable spiral is   With a scanning speed of 1.2 m/s, the playing time is 74 minutes or 650 MiB of data on a CD-ROM. A disc with data packed slightly more densely is tolerated by most players (though some old ones fail). Using a linear velocity of 1.2 m/s and a narrower track pitch of 1.5 µm increases the playing time to 80 minutes, and data capacity to 700 MiB.

A CD is read by focusing a 780 nm wavelength (near infrared) semiconductor laser through the bottom of the polycarbonate layer. The change in height between pits and lands results in a difference in the way the light is reflected. Because the pits are indented into the top layer of the disc and are read through the transparent polycarbonate base, the pits form bumps when read. The laser hits the disc, casting a circle of light wider than the modulated spiral track reflecting partially from the lands and partially from the top of any bumps where they are present. As the laser passes over a pit (bump), its height means that the part of the light reflected from its peak is 1/2 wavelength out of phase with the light reflected from the land around it. This causes partial cancellation of the laser's reflection from the surface. By measuring the reflected intensity change with a photodiode, a modulated signal is read back from the disc.

To accommodate the spiral pattern of data, the laser is placed on a mobile mechanism within the disc tray of any CD player. This mechanism typically takes the form of a sled that moves along a rail. The sled can be driven by a worm gear or linear motor. Where a worm gear is used, a second shorter-throw linear motor, in the form of a coil and magnet, makes fine position adjustments to track eccentricities in the disk at high speed. Some CD drives (particularly those manufactured by Philips during the 1980s and early 1990s) use a swing arm similar to that seen on a gramophone. This mechanism allows the laser to read information from the center to the edge of a disc without having to interrupt the spinning of the disc itself.

The pits and lands do not directly represent the 0s and 1s of binary data. Instead, non-return-to-zero, inverted encoding is used: a change from either pit to land or land to pit indicates a 1, while no change indicates a series of 0s. There must be at least two, and no more than ten 0s between each 1, which is defined by the length of the pit. This, in turn, is decoded by reversing the eight-to-fourteen modulation used in mastering the disc, and then reversing the cross-interleaved Reed–Solomon coding, finally revealing the raw data stored on the disc. These encoding techniques (defined in the Red Book) were originally designed for CD Digital Audio, but they later became a standard for almost all CD formats (such as CD-ROM).

Integrity 
CDs are susceptible to damage during handling and from environmental exposure. Pits are much closer to the label side of a disc, enabling defects and contaminants on the clear side to be out of focus during playback. Consequently, CDs are more likely to suffer damage on the label side of the disc. Scratches on the clear side can be repaired by refilling them with similar refractive plastic or by careful polishing. The edges of CDs are sometimes incompletely sealed, allowing gases and liquids to enter the CD and corrode the metal reflective layer and/or interfere with the focus of the laser on the pits, a condition known as disc rot. The fungus Geotrichum candidum has been found—under conditions of high heat and humidity—to consume the polycarbonate plastic and aluminium found in CDs.

The data integrity of compact discs can be measured using surface error scanning, which can measure the rates of different types of data errors, known as C1, C2, CU and extended (finer-grain) error measurements known as E11, E12, E21, E22, E31 and E32, of which higher rates indicate a possibly damaged or unclean data surface, low media quality, deteriorating media and recordable media written to by a malfunctioning CD writer.

Error scanning can reliably predict data losses caused by media deterioration. Support of error scanning differs between vendors and models of optical disc drives, and extended error scanning (known as "advanced error scanning" in Nero DiscSpeed) has only been available on Plextor and some BenQ optical drives so far, as of 2020.

Disc shapes and diameters 

The digital data on a CD begins at the center of the disc and proceeds toward the edge, which allows adaptation to the different sizes available. Standard CDs are available in two sizes. The size of the hole was chosen by Joop Sinjou and based on a Dutch 10-cent coin: a dubbeltje. Philips/Sony patented the physical dimensions.

The official Philips history says the capacity was specified by Sony executive Norio Ohga to be able to contain the entirety of Beethoven's Ninth Symphony on one disc. 
 This is a myth according to Kees Immink, as the EFM code format had not yet been decided in December 1979, when the 120 mm size was adopted. Instead, however, the information density was lowered by 30 percent to keep the playing time at 74 minutes. The 120 mm diameter has been adopted by subsequent formats, including Super Audio CD, DVD, HD DVD, and Blu-ray Disc. The  diameter discs ("Mini CDs") can hold up to 24 minutes of music or 210 MiB.

Logical format

Audio CD 

The logical format of an audio CD (officially Compact Disc Digital Audio or CD-DA) is described in a document produced in 1980 by the format's joint creators, Sony and Philips. The document is known colloquially as the Red Book CD-DA after the color of its cover. The format is a two-channel 16-bit PCM encoding at a 44.1 kHz sampling rate per channel. Four-channel sound was to be an allowable option within the Red Book format, but has never been implemented. Monaural audio has no existing standard on a Red Book CD; thus, the mono source material is usually presented as two identical channels in a standard Red Book stereo track (i.e., mirrored mono); an MP3 CD, however, can have audio file formats with mono sound.

CD-Text is an extension of the Red Book specification for an audio CD that allows for the storage of additional text information (e.g., album name, song name, artist) on a standards-compliant audio CD. The information is stored either in the lead-in area of the CD, where there are roughly five kilobytes of space available or in the subcode channels R to W on the disc, which can store about 31 megabytes.

Compact Disc + Graphics is a special audio compact disc that contains graphics data in addition to the audio data on the disc. The disc can be played on a regular audio CD player, but when played on a special CD+G player, it can output a graphics signal (typically, the CD+G player is hooked up to a television set or a computer monitor); these graphics are almost exclusively used to display lyrics on a television set for karaoke performers to sing along with. The CD+G format takes advantage of the channels R through W. These six bits store the graphics information.

CD + Extended Graphics (CD+EG, also known as CD+XG) is an improved variant of the Compact Disc + Graphics (CD+G) format. Like CD+G, CD+EG uses basic CD-ROM features to display text and video information in addition to the music being played. This extra data is stored in subcode channels R-W. Very few, if any, CD+EG discs have been published.

Super Audio CD 

Super Audio CD (SACD) is a high-resolution, read-only optical audio disc format that was designed to provide higher-fidelity digital audio reproduction than the Red Book. Introduced in 1999, it was developed by Sony and Philips, the same companies that created the Red Book. SACD was in a format war with DVD-Audio, but neither has replaced audio CDs. The SACD standard is referred to as the Scarlet Book standard.

Titles in the SACD format can be issued as hybrid discs; these discs contain the SACD audio stream as well as a standard audio CD layer which is playable in standard CD players, thus making them backward compatible.

CD-MIDI 
CD-MIDI is a format used to store music-performance data, which upon playback is performed by electronic instruments that synthesize the audio. Hence, unlike the original Red Book CD-DA, these recordings are not digitally sampled audio recordings. The CD-MIDI format is defined as an extension of the original Red Book.

CD-ROM 

For the first few years of its existence, the CD was a medium used purely for audio. However, in 1988, the Yellow Book CD-ROM standard was established by Sony and Philips, which defined a non-volatile optical data computer data storage medium using the same physical format as audio compact discs, readable by a computer with a CD-ROM drive.

Video CD 

Video CD (VCD, View CD, and Compact Disc digital video) is a standard digital format for storing video media on a CD. VCDs are playable in dedicated VCD players, most modern DVD-Video players, personal computers, and some video game consoles. The VCD standard was created in 1993 by Sony, Philips, Matsushita, and JVC and is referred to as the White Book standard.

Overall picture quality is intended to be comparable to VHS video. Poorly compressed VCD video can sometimes be of lower quality than VHS video, but VCD exhibits block artifacts rather than analog noise and does not deteriorate further with each use. 352×240 (or SIF) resolution was chosen because it is half the vertical and half the horizontal resolution of the NTSC video. 352×288 is a similarly one-quarter PAL/SECAM resolution. This approximates the (overall) resolution of an analog VHS tape, which, although it has double the number of (vertical) scan lines, has a much lower horizontal resolution.

Super Video CD 

Super Video CD (Super Video Compact Disc or SVCD) is a format used for storing video media on standard compact discs. SVCD was intended as a successor to VCD and an alternative to DVD-Video and falls somewhere between both in terms of technical capability and picture quality.

SVCD has two-thirds the resolution of DVD, and over 2.7 times the resolution of VCD. One CD-R disc can hold up to 60 minutes of standard-quality SVCD-format video. While no specific limit on SVCD video length is mandated by the specification, one must lower the video bit rate, and therefore quality, to accommodate very long videos. It is usually difficult to fit much more than 100 minutes of video onto one SVCD without incurring a significant quality loss, and many hardware players are unable to play a video with an instantaneous bit rate lower than 300 to 600 kilobits per second.

Photo CD 

Photo CD is a system designed by Kodak for digitizing and storing photos on a CD. Launched in 1992, the discs were designed to hold nearly 100 high-quality images, scanned prints, and slides using special proprietary encoding. Photo CDs are defined in the Beige Book and conform to the CD-ROM XA and CD-i Bridge specifications as well. They are intended to play on CD-i players, Photo CD players, and any computer with suitable software (irrespective of operating system). The images can also be printed out on photographic paper with a special Kodak machine. This format is not to be confused with Kodak Picture CD, which is a consumer product in CD-ROM format.

CD-i 

The Philips Green Book specifies a standard for interactive multimedia compact discs designed for CD-i players (1993). CD-i discs can contain audio tracks that can be played on regular CD players, but CD-i discs are not compatible with most CD-ROM drives and software. The CD-i Ready specification was later created to improve compatibility with audio CD players, and the CD-i Bridge specification was added to create CD-i-compatible discs that can be accessed by regular CD-ROM drives.

CD-i Ready 

Philips defined a format similar to CD-i called CD-i Ready, which puts CD-i software and data into the pregap of track 1. This format was supposed to be more compatible with older audio CD players.

Enhanced Music CD (CD+) 

Enhanced Music CD, also known as CD Extra or CD Plus, is a format that combines audio tracks and data tracks on the same disc by putting audio tracks in a first session and data in a second session. It was developed by Philips and Sony, and it is defined in the Blue Book.

VinylDisc 

VinylDisc is the hybrid of a standard audio CD and the vinyl record. The vinyl layer on the disc's label side can hold approximately three minutes of music.

Manufacture 

In 1995, material costs were 30 cents for the jewel case and 10 to 15 cents for the CD. The wholesale cost of CDs was $0.75 to $1.15, while the typical retail price of a prerecorded music CD was $16.98. On average, the store received 35 percent of the retail price, the record company 27 percent, the artist 16 percent, the manufacturer 13 percent, and the distributor 9 percent. When 8-track cartridges, compact cassettes, and CDs were introduced, each was marketed at a higher price than the format they succeeded, even though the cost to produce the media was reduced. This was done because the perceived value increased. This continued from phonograph records to CDs, but was broken when Apple marketed MP3s for $0.99, and albums for $9.99. The incremental cost, though, to produce an MP3 is negligible.

Writable compact discs

Recordable CD 

Recordable Compact Discs, CD-Rs, are injection-molded with a "blank" data spiral. A photosensitive dye is then applied, after which the discs are metalized and lacquer-coated. The write laser of the CD recorder changes the color of the dye to allow the read laser of a standard CD player to see the data, just as it would with a standard stamped disc. The resulting discs can be read by most CD-ROM drives and played in most audio CD players. CD-Rs follow the Orange Book standard.

CD-R recordings are designed to be permanent. Over time, the dye's physical characteristics may change causing read errors and data loss until the reading device cannot recover with error correction methods. Errors can be predicted using surface error scanning. The design life is from 20 to 100 years, depending on the quality of the discs, the quality of the writing drive, and storage conditions. However, testing has demonstrated such degradation of some discs in as little as 18 months under normal storage conditions. This failure is known as disc rot, for which there are several, mostly environmental, reasons.

The recordable audio CD is designed to be used in a consumer audio CD recorder. These consumer audio CD recorders use SCMS (Serial Copy Management System), an early form of digital rights management (DRM), to conform to the AHRA (Audio Home Recording Act). The Recordable Audio CD is typically somewhat more expensive than CD-R due to lower production volume and a 3 percent AHRA royalty used to compensate the music industry for the making of a copy.

High-capacity recordable CD is a higher-density recording format that can hold 20% more data than conventional discs. The higher capacity is incompatible with some recorders and recording software.

ReWritable CD 

CD-RW is a re-recordable medium that uses a metallic alloy instead of a dye. The write laser, in this case, is used to heat and alter the properties (amorphous vs. crystalline) of the alloy, and hence change its reflectivity. A CD-RW does not have as great a difference in reflectivity as a pressed CD or a CD-R, and so many earlier CD audio players cannot read CD-RW discs, although most later CD audio players and stand-alone DVD players can. CD-RWs follow the Orange Book standard.

The ReWritable Audio CD is designed to be used in a consumer audio CD recorder, which will not (without modification) accept standard CD-RW discs. These consumer audio CD recorders use the Serial Copy Management System (SCMS), an early form of digital rights management (DRM), to conform to the United States' Audio Home Recording Act (AHRA). The ReWritable Audio CD is typically somewhat more expensive than CD-R due to (a) lower volume and (b) a 3 percent AHRA royalty used to compensate the music industry for the making of a copy.

Copy protection 

The Red Book audio specification, except for a simple "anti-copy" statement in the subcode, does not include any copy protection mechanism. Known at least as early as 2001, attempts were made by record companies to market "copy-protected" non-standard compact discs, which cannot be ripped, or copied, to hard drives or easily converted to other formats (like FLAC, MP3 or Vorbis). One major drawback to these copy-protected discs is that most will not play on either computer CD-ROM drives or some standalone CD players that use CD-ROM mechanisms. Philips has stated that such discs are not permitted to bear the trademarked Compact Disc Digital Audio logo because they violate the Red Book specifications. Numerous copy-protection systems have been countered by readily available, often free, software, or even by simply turning off automatic AutoPlay to prevent the running of the DRM executable program.

See also

References

Further reading 
 Ecma International. Standard ECMA-130: Data Interchange on Read-only 120 mm Optical Data Disks (CD-ROM), 2nd edition (June 1996).
 Pohlmann, Kenneth C. (1992). The Compact Disc Handbook. Middleton, Wisconsin: A-R Editions. .
 Peek, Hans et al. (2009) Origins and Successors of the Compact Disc. Springer Science+Business Media B.V. .
 Peek, Hans B., The emergence of the compact disc, IEEE Communications Magazine, Jan. 2010, pp. 10–17.
 Nakajima, Heitaro; Ogawa, Hiroshi (1992) Compact Disc Technology, Tokyo, Ohmsha Ltd. .
 Barry, Robert (2020). Compact Disc (Object Lessons). New York: Bloomsbury. .

External links 

 Video How Compact Discs are Manufactured
 CD-Recordable FAQ Exhaustive basics on CD-Recordable's
 Philips history of the CD (cache)
 Patent History (CD Player) – published by Philips in 2005
 Patent History CD Disc – published by Philips in 2003
 Sony History, Chapter 8, This is the replacement of Gramophone record ! (第8章 レコードに代わるものはこれだ) – Sony website in Japanese
 Popularized History on Soundfountain
 A Media History of the Compact Disc (1-hour podcast interview)

 
120 mm discs
Rotating disc computer storage media
Audio storage
Digital audio storage
Video storage
Consumer electronics
Audiovisual introductions in 1982
Joint ventures
Dutch inventions
Japanese inventions
Information technology in the Netherlands
Science and technology in the Netherlands
Science and technology in Japan
Home video